Lane Cove North is a suburb on the Lower North Shore of Sydney, in the state of New South Wales, Australia. Lane Cove North is located 11 kilometres north-west of the Sydney central business district, in the local government areas of the Municipality of Lane Cove and the City of Willoughby. Lane Cove and Lane Cove West are separate suburbs.

Boundaries are Pacific Highway in east, Epping Road in the south, Lane Cove River in the west and Chatswood Golf Course in the north. The Local Government boundary is Mowbray Road.

History
The suburb of Lane Cove was founded as a World War II veterans' home grant area.

Lane Cove North became a separate suburb on 20 January 2006.

In 2005, the area briefly caught the attention of the world's press when part of an apartment block collapsed into an excavation for the Lane Cove Tunnel and a pet bird in the evacuated block was rescued by a robot. The area is undergoing significant redevelopment.

Heritage listings 
Lane Cove North has a number of heritage-listed sites, including:
 518 Pacific Highway: Chatswood South Uniting Church

Schools
 Mowbray Public School

Churches and Temples
 Presbyterian Church (Indonesian)
 Chatswood South Uniting Church
 Happy Science Shoshinkan

Sport and recreation
 Lane Cove Rugby Club and Lane Cove Junior Rugby Club, Tantallon Oval
 Lane Cove Tigers Junior Rugby League club, Tantallon Oval
 North Sydney Athletics and Northern Suburbs Little Athletics, Chatswood War Memorial Athletic Field
 Tennis Club, corner of Hatfield Street and Mowbray Road
 Scouts, Avian Crescent

Parks
 Tantallon Oval, cnr Epping Road and Tantallon Street
 Chatswood War Memorial Athletic Field, Mowbray Road
 Batten Creek Reserve, Kullah Parade
 Stringybark Reserve, Karilla Avenue
 Helen Street Reserve, Helen Street
 Mindarie Park, Cnr Mindarie and Kullah Streets
 Coolaroo Park, Moola Parade
 Girraween Park, Girraween Street
 Stokes Park, Stokes Street
 Mowbray Park, Ulm Street
 Mowbray Primary Oval, Hatfield Street

Demographics
At the 2016 census, the suburb of Lane Cove North recorded a population of 11,436.  Of these:
 Age distribution: The median age was 34 years, compared to the national median of 38 years. Children aged under 15 years made up 17.2% of the population (national average is 18.7%) and people aged 65 years and over made up 11.2% of the population (national average is 15.8%).
  Ethnic diversity : 51.7% of people were born in Australia, compared to the national average of 66.7%; the next most common countries of birth were China 5.9%, England 3.9%, India 3.1%, New Zealand 1.8% and Hong Kong 1.8%. 58.2% of people spoke only English at home. Other languages spoken at home included Mandarin 6.8%, Cantonese 4.3%, Spanish 2.0%, Japanese 1.9% and Nepali 1.9%.
 Finances: The median household weekly income was $2,161, compared to the national median of $1,438. This difference is also reflected in real estate prices, with the median mortgage payment in Lane Cove North being $2,400 per month, compared to the national median of $1,755.
 Transport: On the day of the Census, 34.8% of employed people used public transport as at least one of their methods of travel to work and 47.8% used car (either as driver or as passenger).
 Housing: 69.4% of occupied private dwellings were flats, units or apartments; 24.1% were separate houses, and 6.4% were semi-detached (row or terrace houses, townhouses etc.). The average household size was 2.4 people.
 Religion: The most common response for religion was No Religion (34.9%); the next most common responses were Catholic 21.6% and Anglican 10.5%.

Notes

References

External links
 

Suburbs of Sydney